Anna Ziegler may refer to the following people:

 Anna Ziegler (playwright) (born 1979), American playwright
 Anna Ziegler (politician) (1882–1942), German Weimar-era politician
 Anne Ziegler (1910–2003), English singer
 Anna Ziegler, Zurich gatekeeper during the Battle of St. Jakob an der Sihl (1443)